Sakhr Software Company is an Arabic language technology company based in Kuwait. It deals with products for the Middle East in e-governance, education, wireless, and security. Sakhr was founded in 1982 by Mohammed AlSharekh.

The Company currently has 200 employees worldwide. Its research and engineering activities are in Silicon Valley and Egypt, with sales offices in the United States (Washington, DC and California), Kuwait, UAE (Dubai and Abu Dhabi), Oman, Egypt and Saudi Arabia.

History

Sakhr was founded in 1982 by Mohammed AlSharekh.

In 1990, following the first events of the Gulf War, Sakhr relocated to Heliopolis, Cairo. After the relocation, the company changed its approach by terminating all computer manufacturing projects to focus exclusively on developing software products.

Sakhr provided Arabic language localization services to the Saudi's Ministry of Education, Egypt's Ministry of Commerce, Oman's Ministry of Education, and the Dubai Chamber of Commerce and Industry.

Dial Directions 

In 2009, Sakhr acquired Dial Directions, Inc., a United States Silicon Valley software company providing language applications for mobile cloud-computing environments, including wireless carriers, telematics, and “smartphones” such as the Apple iPhone to enhance its market position in the emerging mobile application & cloud computing market.

Awards 

Sakhr software has won the following  International awards:

 eContent Award – Arabic Language Buddy for smart phones (2010)
 Oman Portal – Arab Web Awards (2010)
 World Summit Award –  (Screen reader for the blind) (2007)
 World Summit Award – Best e-content (Web Content Translation Engine – Tarjim) (2005)
 Arabian Business E-Achievement Award E-Visionary of the Year (2002)
 Internet Shopper (T4S International Group): Best Arabic Language Supported Site (GITEX Cairo 2000)
 Damtex Middle East Group: Best Arabic Application Development Company (1999)

See also
Sakhr Computers
Arabic machine translation

References

Notes

 Sakhr Software – Arabic Language Technology
 #1 in Arabic Translation by U.S. Government metrics
 Arabic language app walks the talk – Government Computer News
 Etisalat inks deal to bring internet to the blind
 Getting smart on wireless in the classroom
 The Latest App: Smartphone Interpreters
 Speech Recognition iPhone App Translates Arabic On the Fly
 Merger Could Bring Major Tool To Military: Arabic-English Translation Via Cell Phone

1982 establishments in Kuwait
Companies established in 1982
Software companies of Kuwait
Kuwaiti brands
MSX